Stanley Fields (born Walter L. Agnew; May 20, 1883April 23, 1941) was an American actor.

Biography
On Broadway, Fields performed in Fifty Miles from Boston (1908) and The Red Widow (1911). After that, for eight years, Fields  performed in vaudeville with Frank Fay. he started on a film career with a screen debut as a gunman in her talkie New York Nights. In 1930, he signed a long-term contract with Paramount Pictures.

He died on April 23, 1941, of a heart attack.

Selected filmography

New York Nights (1929) - Hood (uncredited)
Street of Chance (1930) - Dorgan
Dangerous Paradise (1930) - Steamer Captain (uncredited)
Mammy (1930) - Pig Eyes (uncredited)
Captain of the Guard (1930) - Hangman (uncredited)
Ladies Love Brutes (1930) - Mike Mendino
The Border Legion (1930) - Hack Gulden
Manslaughter (1930) - Peters
Her Man (1930) - Al
The Lottery Bride (1930) - Bartender (uncredited)
See America Thirst (1930) - Spumoni
Hook, Line and Sinker (1930) - McKay - Blackwell Henchman
Little Caesar (1931) - Sam Vettori
Cimarron (1931) - Lon Yountis
Cracked Nuts (1931) - Gen. Bogardus
City Streets (1931) - Blackie
A Holy Terror (1931) - Butch Morgan
Traveling Husbands (1931) - Dan Murphy - House Detective
Skyline (1931) - Captain Breen
Riders of the Purple Sage (1931) - Oldring
Way Back Home (1931) - Rufe Turner
Girl of the Rio (1932) - Mike
Two Kinds of Women (1932) - Harry Glassman
Girl Crazy (1932) - Lank Sanders
Destry Rides Again (1932) - Sheriff Jerry Wendell
The Mouthpiece (1932) - Mr. Pondapolis
The Painted Woman (1932) - Yank
Hell's Highway (1932) - F. E. Whiteside
One Way Passage (1932) - Freighter Captain (uncredited)
Rackety Rax (1932) - Gilatti
Sherlock Holmes (1932) - Tony Ardetti
The Kid from Spain (1932) - Jose
Island of Lost Souls (1932) - Captain Davies
The Constant Woman (1933) - Beef - Stagehand
Destination Unknown (1933) - Gattallo
Terror Aboard (1933) - Capt. Swanson
He Couldn't Take It (1933) - Sweet Sue
Roman Scandals (1933) - Slave Auctioneer (uncredited)
Palooka (1934) - Blacky Wolfe (uncredited)
Sing and Like It (1934) - Butch - Hood
Strictly Dynamite (1934) - Pussy
Many Happy Returns (1934) - Joe 
 Name the Woman (1934) - Dawson
Rocky Rhodes (1934) - Harp Haverty
Kid Millions (1934) - Oscar Wilson
Life Returns (1935) - Dog Catcher
Helldorado (1935) - Truck Driver
Baby Face Harrington (1935) - Mullens
The Daring Young Man (1935) - Rafferty
Mutiny on the Bounty (1935) - Muspratt
Black Gold (1936) - Lefty Stevens
It Had to Happen (1936) - Mug
O'Malley of the Mounted (1936) - Red Jagger
The Mine with the Iron Door (1936) - Dempsey
The King Steps Out (1936) - Bruiser (uncredited)
Show Boat (1936) - Backwoodsman with Gun (uncredited)
Ticket to Paradise (1936) - Dan Kelly
The Devil Is a Sissy (1936) - Joe
The Gay Desperado (1936) - Butch
Maid of Salem (1937) - First Mate
The Great O'Malley (1937) - Convict at Lathe (uncredited)
Midnight Court (1937) - 'Slim' Jacobs
Way Out West (1937) - Sheriff
The Hit Parade (1937) - Bedtime Story Man
The Last Train from Madrid (1937) - Avila (uncredited)
Three Legionnaires (1937) - Gen. Stavinski
The Toast of New York (1937) - Top Sergeant
Souls at Sea (1937) - Captain Paul M. Granley
The Sheik Steps Out (1937) - Abu Saal
All Over Town (1937) - Slug
Wife, Doctor and Nurse (1937) - Delivery Man
Danger – Love at Work (1937) - Thug
Counsel for Crime (1937) - George Evans
Ali Baba Goes to Town (1937) - Tramp
Roll Along, Cowboy (1937) - Barry Barker
Wells Fargo (1937) - Abe - Prospector
Algiers (1938) - Carlos
Of Human Hearts (1938) - Horse Owner (uncredited)
Arsène Lupin Returns (1938) - André - Horse Groom (uncredited)
The Adventures of Marco Polo (1938) - Bayan
Wide Open Faces (1938) - Duke Temple
Panamint's Bad Man (1938) - Harold 'Black Jack' Deavers
Painted Desert (1938) - Bill
Straight, Place and Show (1938) - Slippery Sol
The Sisters (1938) - Ship's Captain (uncredited)
Flirting with Fate (1938) - Fernando
Off the Record (1939) - Big Bruiser (uncredited)
Blackwell's Island (1939) - 'Bull' Bransom
Chasing Danger (1939) - Captain Fontaine
The Kid from Kokomo (1939) - Muscles Malone
Exile Express (1939) - Tony Kassan
Hell's Kitchen (1939) - Buck
 Fugitive at Large (1939) - Manning
Pack Up Your Troubles (1939) - Sgt. Walker
Viva Cisco Kid (1940) - Boss
King of the Lumberjacks (1940) - Dominic Deribault
Ski Patrol (1940) - Birger Simberg
New Moon (1940) - Tambour
Wyoming (1940) - Curley - Henchman (uncredited)
The Great Plane Robbery (1940) - Frankie Toller
Where Did You Get That Girl? (1941) - Crandall
The Lady from Cheyenne (1941) - Jerry Stover
 I'll Sell My Life (1941) - Bochini (final film role)

References

External links

 
 
 
 

1883 births
1941 deaths
American male film actors
American male boxers
20th-century American male actors
Broadway theatre people
Male Western (genre) film actors
Vaudeville performers